Scott Koons (born April 11, 1976) is an American short track speed skater. He competed in the men's 1000 metres event at the 1998 Winter Olympics.

References

External links
 

1976 births
Living people
American male short track speed skaters
Olympic short track speed skaters of the United States
Short track speed skaters at the 1998 Winter Olympics
Sportspeople from Cleveland